Max Headroom is a fictional computer-generated character played by comedian Matt Frewer.

Max Headroom may also refer to:

 Max Headroom: 20 Minutes into the Future (1985), British telefilm that introduced the character
 The Max Headroom Show (1985–87), video, music and talk show which followed the 1985 telefilm
 Max Headroom (TV series) (1987–88), American satirical science fiction series based on the British telefilm

See also
 Max Headroom signal hijacking